Unión Minas is a Peruvian football club, playing in the city of Cerro de Pasco.

The club was founded 23 April 1974 and plays in the Copa Perú which is the third division of the Peruvian league.

History
The club has played at the highest level of Peruvian football on sixteen occasions, from 1986 Torneo Descentralizado until 2001 Torneo Descentralizado when it was relegated to 2002 Copa Perú.

In the 2002 Copa Perú, the club participated in the Regional Stage, but was eliminated by León de Huánuco, Sport Dos de Mayo, and Universidad Nacional Daniel Alcides Carrión.

In the 2008 Copa Perú, the club classified to the Regional Stage, but was eliminated by Deportivo Wanka and Alianza Universidad.

In the 2010 Copa Perú, the club classified to the Regional Stage, but was eliminated by Asociación Deportiva Tarma and Alianza Universidad.

Notable players

Honours

National
Liga Departamental de Pasco:
Winners (2): 1978, 1984
 Runner-up (2): 2008, 2010

Liga Superior de Pasco:
Winners (1): 2010
 Runner-up (1): 2009

Liga Distrital de Atacocha-La Quinua:
Winners (1): 2022

Liga Distrital de Cerro de Pasco:
Winners (4): 1978, 1980, 1982, 1984

Liga Distrital de Chaupimarca:
Winners (4): 1976, 1981

See also
List of football clubs in Peru
Peruvian football league system

References

Football clubs in Peru
Association football clubs established in 1974